Generalized trichoepitheliomas are characterized histologically by replacement of the hair follicles by trichoepithelioma-like epithelial proliferations associated with hyperplastic sebaceous glands.

See also
 Skin lesion
 List of cutaneous conditions

References

 

Genodermatoses